May Day Riots may refer to:

May Day riots of 1894 Cleveland, Ohio, U.S.
May Day riots of 1919, Cleveland, Ohio, U.S.
 Bloody May Day, riots of May 1, 1952 in Tokyo, Japan
 Evil May Day (1517), London, England
 The 2000 disturbances in London associated with International Workers' Day (May Day)